Dalchev Cove (‘Dalchev Zaliv’ \'dal-chev 'za-liv\) is the 3.72 km wide cove indenting for 2.45 km the northwest coast of Parker Peninsula on the northeast coast Anvers Island in the Palmer Archipelago, Antarctica.  It is the part of Fournier Bay entered east of Studena Point, having its head fed by Altimir Glacier.

The cove is named after the Bulgarian sculptor Lyubomir Dalchev (1902-2002).

Location
British mapping in 1980.

Maps
 British Antarctic Territory.  Scale 1:200000 topographic map.  DOS 610 Series, Sheet W 64 62.  Directorate of Overseas Surveys, UK, 1980.
 Antarctic Digital Database (ADD). Scale 1:250000 topographic map of Antarctica. Scientific Committee on Antarctic Research (SCAR). Since 1993, regularly upgraded and updated.

References
 Bulgarian Antarctic Gazetteer. Antarctic Place-names Commission. (details in Bulgarian, basic data in English)
 Dalchev Cove. SCAR Composite Antarctic Gazetteer.

External links
 Dalchev Cove. Copernix satellite image

Coves of Graham Land
Bulgaria and the Antarctic